Assara quadriguttella is a species of snout moth in the genus Assara. It was described by Francis Walker in 1866 and is found in Australia.

References

Moths described in 1866
Phycitini
Moths of Australia